Pierre Bourliaud (born 1985) is a French slalom canoeist who competed at the international level from 2002 to 2016.

Bourliaud won two silver medals in the K1 team event at the ICF Canoe Slalom World Championships, earning them in 2007 and 2010.

World Cup individual podiums

1 Oceania Canoe Slalom Open counting for World Cup points

References

2010 ICF Canoe Slalom World Championships 12 September 2010 K1 men's team final results - accessed 12 September 2010.

French male canoeists
Living people
1985 births
Medalists at the ICF Canoe Slalom World Championships